What's a Girl Like You Doing in a Place Like This? is a 1978 comedy film directed by Fernando Colomo from a screenplay by Colomo and Jaime Chávarri which stars Carmen Maura. It helped to consolidate the comedia madrileña film trend.

Plot 
The plot follows the vicissitudes of hairdresser Rosa, separated from fascist former cop Jorge, and her escapist forays with a trendy rock musician.

Cast

Production 
The film shares its original title with the main theme song, commissioned to music band . It is a La Salamandra PC production. Shooting took place in Madrid during five weeks.

Release 
The film was theatrically released in Spain on 25 September 1978. It grossed 38,470,025 ₧ (335,139 admissions).

See also 
 List of Spanish films of 1978

References 

1970s Spanish films
1970s Spanish-language films
1978 comedy films
Films shot in Madrid
Films directed by Fernando Colomo